Fall Creek Township, Indiana is the name of three townships in the U.S. state of Indiana:

 Fall Creek Township, Hamilton County, Indiana
 Fall Creek Township, Henry County, Indiana
 Fall Creek Township, Madison County, Indiana

See also
 Fall Creek Township (disambiguation)

Indiana township disambiguation pages